The Dith Pran Holocaust Awareness Project is an American non-profit organization, founded in 1994 by Killing Fields survivor Dith Pran to educate the world about the genocide that took place in Cambodia during the reign of the Khmer Rouge from 1975 to 1979. The organization also keeps photographic records to help Cambodians who are searching for missing family members.  Dith Pran headed the organization until his death in 2008, when his widow Kim DePaul assumed that position.

References

External links
The Dith Pran Holocaust Awareness Project at the Internet Archive

Anti-communist organizations
Commemoration of communist crimes
Non-profit organizations based in the United States
United States educational programs